This is a list of operators of the Harrier family of military V/STOL aircraft, designed and built in the United Kingdom and United States of America. The members of family were Hawker Siddeley P.1127, Hawker Siddeley Harrier (AV-8A), British Aerospace Sea Harrier, McDonnell Douglas AV-8B Harrier II, and British Aerospace Harrier II. As of 2012, only the AV-8B and Sea Harrier remain in active service.

P.1127 / prototype / evaluation aircraft operators

 Aeroplane and Armament Experimental Establishment P.1127 and Kestrel trials and evaluation
 Royal Air Force
Central Fighter Establishment – Kestrel (P.1127) Evaluation Squadron (also known as the Tripartite Evaluation Squadron), nine Kestrel aircraft allocated for evaluation in 1965. One aircraft was lost in an accident, six aircraft later passed to the United States Army, one to the RAE and one to Hawker-Siddeley for further trials.
Royal Aircraft Establishment P.1127 and Kestrel trials and evaluation.

United States Army
(aircrew participated in both the Tri-partite Evaluation Squadron and as part of the American XV-6A Tri-service evaluation team. Had three Kestrel aircraft allocated after the evaluation at West Raynham and also acquired the three allocated to Germany. Four later transferred to the United States Air Force and two to the National Aeronautics and Space Administration).
United States Air Force
(aircrew participated in both the Tri-partite Evaluation Squadron and as part of the American XV-6A Tri-service evaluation team but had no aircraft allocated after the evaluation at West Raynham, four former United States Army aircraft operated for trials).
United States Navy
(aircrew participated in both the Tri-partite Evaluation Squadron and as part of the American XV-6A Tri-service evaluation team but had no aircraft allocated after the evaluation).
NASA
operated two former United States Army Kestrels.

German Air Force
(aircrew participated in the Tri-partite Evaluation Squadron, three allocated Kestrel aircraft not delivered and passed to United States Army)

First generation Harrier operators

 Indian Navy - Indian Naval Air Arm
 Indian Naval Air Squadron 552
Operated the Harrier T.60 for Sea Harrier training, with two T4(I) as replacements.

 Spanish Navy
 No. 008 Escuadrilla – AV-8S and TAV-8S Matador.

Royal Thai Navy
Squadron 1 Wing3 (HTMS Chakri Naruebet Flying Unit) – AV-8S and TAV-8S. By 1999, only one aircraft of the 10 former Spanish aircraft received was believed to be airworthy because of lack of available spares. In 2006 the Harrier was retired from service.

 Royal Air Force
No. 1 Squadron RAF
re-equipped with Harrier GR.1s between July and October 1969 at RAF Wittering. It started to replace its first generation Harriers with Harrier GR.5s in 1988, discarding its last GR.3 on 31 March 1989.
No. 3 Squadron RAF
formed at RAF Wildenrath with the Harrier GR.1A on 1 January 1971, moving to RAF Gütersloh in 1977. It re-equipped with Harrier GR.5s in 1989.
 No. 4 Squadron RAF
converted to HarrierGR.1s at RAF Wittering in early 1970, moving to Wildenrath in Germany in June that year. It moved to RAF Gütersloh in January 1977 and replaced its GR.3s with Harrier GR.7s in 1990.
No. 20 Squadron RAF
reformed at RAF Wittering in October 1970, moving to Wildenrath later that year. It disbanded in February 1977, with its aircraft being shared between the other two Germany based squadrons.
No. 233 Operational Conversion Unit RAF
formed at Wittering from the Harrier Conversion Unit in October 1970. No 233 OCU was assigned the numberplate 20(R) Squadron in 1992, with the unit flying GR.3 until 1994 and the T.4 until 1996.
No. 1417 Flight RAF
Deployed to Belize from 1980 to 1993.
No. 1453 Flight RAF
Deployed to Stanley, in the Falkland Islands from August 1983 to June 1985.
Royal Navy - Fleet Air Arm
899 Naval Air Squadron
operated the Harrier T.4A and T.4N for training purposes for the Sea Harrier.

United States Marine Corps
 VMA-231
AV-8A/C Harrier. 1973–1985.
VMA-513
AV-8A/C Harrier. 1971–1986.
VMA-542
AV-8A/C Harrier. 1972–1986.
VMAT-203
Training squadron, equipped with AV-8A and TAV-8A Harrier. 1975–1987.

Sea Harrier operators

Indian Navy - Indian Naval Air Arm – Sea Harrier F.52
Indian Naval Air Squadron 300
'White Tigers'

 Fleet Air Arm – Sea Harrier FRS.1 and Sea Harrier F(A).2
 800 Naval Air Squadron
disbanded 2006
 801 Naval Air Squadron
disbanded 2006
 809 Naval Air Squadron
disbanded 1982
 899 Naval Air Squadron
disbanded 2006

McDonnell Douglas AV-8B Harrier II operators

Italian Navy
14 AV-8B Plus and 2 TAV-8B Harrier IIs in service as of December 2010.
Gruppo Aerei Imbarcati – "The Wolves"

Spanish Navy
16 EAV-8B Plus and 1 TAV-8B aircraft operational as of December 2010.
09th Squadron

United States Marine Corps
The Marine Corps currently retains 126 AV-8B and TAV-8B aircraft, with only 80 Harrier aircraft in active service as of 2018. Each fighter squadron operates 16 AV-8B Harrier jets. The Marine Corps currently plans to have all squadrons transitioned to or start to transition to the F-35 platform by 2026.
VMA-211 (1990-2016. Converted to F-35B)
VMA-214 (1989-2022. Converted to F-35B)
VMA-223 (1987-present. To convert to F-35B)
VMA-231 
VMA-311 (1988-2020. To convert to F-35C)
VMA-513 (1944-2013. Reactivated as VMFAT-502 in 2020. Converted to F-35B)
VMA-542 (1986-2022. To convert to F-35B)
VMAT-203 (operates 13 AV-8B's and 13 TAV-8B's)
VX-31

BAE Systems Harrier II operators

Royal Air Force
(1989–2011) – BAE Systems Harrier II GR.5 / GR.5a / GR.7 / GR.7a / GR.9 / GR.9a / T.10 / T.12
No. 1 Squadron
No. 3 Squadron (until 2006)
No. 4 Squadron
No. 20 Squadron (until 2010)
Strike Attack Operational Evaluation Unit (SAOEU)

Royal Navy – Fleet Air Arm
BAE Systems Harrier II GR.7 / GR.7a / GR.9 / GR.9a
800 Naval Air Squadron (2006–2007, 2010)
Naval Strike Wing (2007–2010)

See also

 Aircraft in fiction#Harrier family
 List of Harrier family losses

References
Notes
Citations

Bibliography

 
Evans, Andy. BAe/McDonald Douglas Harrier. Ramsbury, UK: The Crowood Press, 1998. .
Jackson, Paul. "British Aerospace/McDonnell Douglas Harrier". World Air Power Journal, Volume 6, Summer 1991. pp. 46–105.
Mason, Francis K. Hawker Aircraft since 1920. London: Putnam, 1991. 
Sturtivant, Ray. Fleet Air Arm Fixed-Wing Aircraft since 1946.  Tonbridge, Kent, UK: Air-Britain (Historians), 2004. .

Harrier
Harrier
Harrier
operators